Jettha Tissa III was King of Anuradhapura in the 7th century, whose reign lasted from 623 to 624. He succeeded Aggabodhi III by a successful rebellion. He had sent his general Datasiva to the western part of the country to lay waste. The general was defeated by King Aggabodhi's sub-king Mana. Prince Jetta Tissa however withstood the King's forces and defeated him.

King Jetta Thissa bestowed land grants to various viharas throughout the land.

On the return of former king Aggabodhi III with an Indian army the King ventured to meet him at the head of the royal forces. A great battle ensued near Kalawewa and the king was defeated.

On seeing that he is being defeated, the King Jetta Thissa instructed his minister to carry a message to his queen to enter into a monastery and to learn and preach abhidhamma and to offer that merit to him. Then he moved forward on his elephant slaying every Indian he encountered. When he was fatigued by this an Indian called Veluppa advance to fight with the king. At his point rather than being defeated the king Jetta Thissa committed suicide.

He was succeeded by Aggabodhi III as King of Anuradhapura.

See also
 List of Sri Lankan monarchs
 History of Sri Lanka

References

External links
 Kings & Rulers of Sri Lanka

J
J
J
J